Gary Charles Erbe (April 12, 1951 – March 10, 2019), known as Raven Grimassi, was an American author of over 20 books, including topics on Wicca, Stregheria, witchcraft and neo-paganism. He popularized Stregheria, the religious practice of witchcraft with roots in Italy. Grimassi presented this material in the form of neo-paganism through his books. He had been a practitioner of witchcraft for over 45 years and was the co-director of the Ash, Birch and Willow tradition. He died of pancreatic cancer on March 10, 2019.

Early life and education
Grimassi was born Gary Charles Erbe in Pittsburgh, Pennsylvania. His father was Herbert Erbe Jr. (1922–2004), who was of German and Scots heritage, and who served as a sergeant in the United States Army in World War II. His mother was Flora Gemma Erbe (1915–2011), born in Pagani, Campania.

Herbert and Flora met in Italy during his military service, and they married in 1944. Flora's father was Giovanni Rescigno, a train station master in Naples, a Freemason, and an Italian witch. He entered the Order of the Pentagram in 1930.  Grimassi wrote that his maternal grandfather was part of a tradition of Italian witches who were associated with the Carbonari revolutionary movement in the early 19th century, then joined the Masons or other secret societies as a cover for their meetings.

After some time in Pittsburgh, Herbert and Flora settled in San Diego, California, where they raised their children. Grimassi attended James Madison High School, advancing to San Diego Mesa College and San Diego City College where he studied to be a psychiatric technician.

Wicca
Grimassi became involved with Wicca in 1969. He created his own system of witchcraft known as the "Aradian Tradition" ten years later, publishing it in print beginning in 1981.  He was the co-directing elder of the Ash, Birch and Willow tradition.  In 1994, the new age publisher Llewellyn Publications accepted his manuscript for Ways of the Strega, which was reprinted the following year as Italian Witchcraft: The Old Religion of Southern Europe.

Stregheria
Reports that Grimassi claimed to belong to a "family tradition" of religious witchcraft had opened him to criticism.

Professor Sabina Magliocco, a critic of some of Grimassi's claims, however points out that "Grimassi never claims to be reproducing exactly what was practiced by Italian immigrants to North America; he admits Italian-American immigrants "have adapted a few Wiccan elements into their ways". After personally meeting Grimassi, Professor Magliocco wrote in her letter to the Pomegranate Reader's Forum:  
I had the pleasure of meeting Raven Grimassi during the summer of 2001, unfortunately after the final draft of my article had already been submitted to The Pom. He was very gracious and helpful to me. From information he revealed during our interview, I can say with reasonable certainty that I believe him to have been initiated into a domestic tradition of folk magic and healing such as I describe in my article.

Awards
Grimassi won "Book of the Year" and "First Place – Spirituality Book" from the Coalition of Visionary Retailers in 1998 for his book The Wiccan Mysteries, and his book the Encyclopedia of Wicca & Witchcraft was also awarded "Best Non-Fiction". His publisher, Weiser Books, produced the author's biography, Horns of Honor.
Patheos listed Grimassi in 2018 as one of the 25 most influential living pagans.

Personal life
In the 1970s, Grimassi recorded a garage rock song with Ritchie Brubaiter, called "Brat". After studying psychology in college, he worked for a few years for San Diego County Mental Health Services inside a secure psychiatric facility. He shifted to a center for abused children, then worked as a counselor for drug and alcohol abuse patients. The stress of these jobs moved him to study cosmetology and become a hair stylist for many years. After that he served as a financial aid counselor, then in the mid-1990s his book publishing income allowed a full-time writing career.

Grimassi's first marriage with Patty produced Michelle, born in San Diego, and his second marriage with Diane produced a daughter in 1979 – Brieanna, born in Escondido, California. Grimassi dedicated his book The Wiccan Mysteries to his "beautiful daughters, Michelle and Brieanna...". Grimassi's father died in 2004 and was buried at Fort Rosecrans National Cemetery in San Diego. His mother died in 2011 and was buried with her husband.

Grimassi's third marriage was to Stephanie Ann Zarrabi, pen-name Stephanie Taylor. From 1998, they operated a magick shop in Escondido called Raven's Loft, closing the physical store in 2002 to run it as a website. The couple moved to Springfield, Massachusetts, in 2009, but suffered a lightning strike in June 2017 which burned down their home and destroyed their business assets. Stephanie announced on her Facebook page that Grimassi died on March 10, 2019, aged 67, following a battle with pancreatic cancer. He was survived by two brothers and three daughters: Kathy, Michelle and Brieanna. A memorial service was held on March 23 in Springfield.

Bibliography 
1981:  The Book of the Holy Strega
1981:  The Book of Ways Volumes I and II
1994:  Ways of the Strega
reprinted as Italian Witchcraft: The Old Religion of Southern Europe in 1995
1999:  
2000:  
2001:  
2001    
2002:  
2002:  
2002:  
2003:  
2003:  
2004:  
2005:  
2007:  
2008:  
2009:  
2011:  
2014:  
2016:  
2019:  Grimassi, Raven (September 2019).  What We Knew in the Night.  Weiser Books.  .

References

Sources

 Magliocco, Sabina "...this state of affairs, along with the lack of ethnographic evidence to corroborate the reports of Martello, Bruno and Grimassi, makes the existence of an Italian witch cult among Italian-Americans extremely unlikely." in

External links 
Raven Grimassi's homepage

1951 births
2019 deaths
American people of Italian descent
American spiritual writers
American Wiccans
American encyclopedists
Deaths from pancreatic cancer
San Diego Mesa College alumni
Writers from Pittsburgh
Writers from San Diego
Wiccan writers